Johndoe is a Norwegian punk, rock and powerpop band from Trondheim made up of Jonas Skybakmoen (vocals and guitar), Terje Uv (guitar), Øystein M. Eide (bass) and Stian Lundberg (drums). After three consecutive albums in the 2000s, the band went on a hiatus in 2006, to make a comeback in 2013-2014 with the album Slugger.

Discography

Albums

Singles

References

External links
Official website

Norwegian rock music groups